Tarja Liljeström (born 14 May 1946) is a Finnish diver. She competed in two events at the 1968 Summer Olympics.

References

External links
 

1946 births
Living people
Finnish female divers
Olympic divers of Finland
Divers at the 1968 Summer Olympics
Divers from Helsinki